Matthew Holmes is an Australian film director, producer, writer and actor.

Biography 
Holmes started his film career as a stop-motion animator.

He also worked as an animator and sculptor on several Award-winning short films directed by Michael Cusack, including The Book-Keeper, (R)evolution and Gargoyle. Gargoyle won an AACTA Award for Best Short Animation in 2006. 

Holmes first full-length film Twin Rivers was a live-action drama and was made primarily with support from family and friends, with no crew. Filming began in 2001 and continued for four years, wrapping in 2004. 

Holmes was one of the lead animators on the 2013 short film Woody, directed by Stuart Bowen.

When the trailer for The Legend of Ben Hall was released, the project was picked up by Odin's Eye Entertainment and RCL Motion Picture Entertainment and expanded into a 2-hour feature film, incorporating the footage from the short film into the feature. Australian director Greg McLean joined the project as an Executive Producer in February 2015. Filming began in regional Victoria in March 2015 and continued into June. The Legend of Ben Hall was released in 2016.

Filmography
 The Runaway Cowboys, short (1993)
 The Galaxies Tastiest Milkshake, short (1994) 
 It's a Dog's Life, short (1996)
 The Scam, short (1999)
 The BookKeeper, short (1999) (animator)
 Eggabord & Bacon-Boy, short (2001)
 (R)evolution short (2003) (animator)
 The Biscuit Effect, feature (2004)
 Gargoyle, short (2006) (animator)
 Twin Rivers, feature (2007)
 Crooked, web series (2010)
 The Vandabelles – Say Goodbye, music video (2011) 
 Woody, short (2013) (animator)
 The Artifice, short (2014)
 The Legend of Ben Hall, feature (2016)
 The Cost, feature (2022)

References 

Australian film directors
Living people
Year of birth missing (living people)